The Pontefract by-election, 1893 could refer to:
Pontefract by-election, February 1893
Pontefract by-election, June 1893